Syd Barrett is a 1974 double-album pairing of Syd Barrett's two solo albums, The Madcap Laughs and Barrett, both originally released in the UK in 1970.

Cover
During the summer of 1965, Barrett had his first acid trip in the garden of his friend Dave Gale, with Ian Moore and Storm Thorgerson. While on the influence of the acid, Barrett had placed an orange, plum and a matchbox into a corner, while staring at the fruit, which he claimed symbolized "Venus and Jupiter". Thorgerson used this imagery when he added these items to the cover of Syd Barrett.

Release
After the unexpectedly massive success of Pink Floyd's The Dark Side of the Moon, EMI re-issued the Barrett-era albums The Piper at the Gates of Dawn and A Saucerful of Secrets as A Nice Pair in the hope that fans would be interested in the band's earlier work with Barrett. Once that was a success, primarily in the US where neither album had been issued initially, Syd Barrett was compiled to meet demand.

As a result, The Madcap Laughs/Barrett (as it was titled in the US) made number 163, giving Barrett his only US chart album. Village Voice critic Robert Christgau wrote of the album: "Admittedly, a lot of what results is worthy of the wimp-turned-acid-casualty Barrett is. But a lot of it is funny, charming, catchy--whimsy at its best... I know damn well it gives me more pleasure than The Dark Side of the Moon."

Track listing
All songs by Syd Barrett, except where noted.

Disc 1 – The Madcap Laughs
Side one
 "Terrapin" – 5:04
 "No Good Trying" – 3:26
 "Love You" – 2:30
 "No Man's Land" – 3:03
 "Dark Globe" – 2:02
 "Here I Go" – 3:11
Side two
"Octopus" – 3:47
 "Golden Hair" (Syd Barrett/James Joyce) – 1:59
 "Long Gone" – 2:50
 "She Took a Long Cold Look" – 1:55
 "Feel" – 2:17
 "If it's in You" – 2:26
 "Late Night" – 3:11

Disc 2 – Barrett
Side one
 "Baby Lemonade" – 4:11
 "Love Song" – 3:05
 "Dominoes" – 4:09
 "It is Obvious" – 3:00
 "Rats" – 3:02
 "Maisie" – 2:51
Side two
"Gigolo Aunt" – 5:47
 "Waving My Arms in the Air" – 2:07
 "I Never Lied to You" – 1:52
 "Wined and Dined" – 2:59
 "Wolfpack" – 3:41
 "Effervescing Elephant" – 1:54

Charts
Album - Billboard

References 

Syd Barrett albums
1974 compilation albums
Albums produced by David Gilmour
Albums produced by Richard Wright (musician)
Harvest Records compilation albums
EMI Records compilation albums
Albums with cover art by Hipgnosis